The San Diego Supercomputer Center (SDSC) is an organized research unit of the University of California, San Diego (UCSD).  SDSC is located at the UCSD campus' Eleanor Roosevelt College east end, immediately north the Hopkins Parking Structure.

The current SDSC director is Michael L. Norman,  UCSD physics professor,  who succeeded noted grid computing pioneer Francine Berman. He was named director September 2010, having been interim director more than a year.

SDSC was founded in 1985 and describes its mission as "developing and using technology to advance science."  The SDSC was one of the five original NSF Supercomputing Centers and the National Science Foundation (NSF) continues to be a primary funder of the SDSC. Its research pursuits are high performance computing, grid computing, computational biology, geoinformatics, computational physics, computational chemistry, data management, scientific visualization, and computer networking. SDSC computational biosciences contributions and earth science and genomics computational approaches are internationally recognized.

Divisions and projects
SDSC roles include creating and maintaining the Protein Data Bank, the George E. Brown, Jr. Network for Earthquake Engineering Simulation Cyberinfrastructure Center (NEESit), cyberinfrastructure for the geosciences (GEON), and the Tree of Life Project (TOL) are especially well known.

SDSC is one of the four original TeraGrid project sites with National Center for Supercomputing Applications (NCSA), Argonne National Laboratory, and the Center for Advanced Computing Research (CACR).

SDSC is a data management software development pioneer, having developed the Rocks cluster computing environment and storage resource broker (SRB).

SDSC is home to the Performance Modeling and Characterization (PMaC) laboratory, whose mission is to bring scientific rigor to the prediction and understanding of factors affecting the performance of current and projected High Performance Computing (HPC) platforms. PMaC is funded by the Department of Energy (SciDac PERC research grant), the Department of Defense (Navy DSRC PET program), DARPA, and the National Science Foundation. Allan E. Snavely founded the PMaC laboratory in 2001.

In 2009 a combined team from SDSC and Lawrence Berkeley National Labs led by Allan Snavely won the prestigious Data Challenge competition held in Portland Oregon, at SC09, the annual premier conference in High Performance Computing, Networking, Storage and Analysis for their design of a new kind of supercomputer that makes extensive use of flash memory and nicknamed "Dash". Dash is a prototype for a much larger system nicknamed "Gordon" that the team will deploy at SDSC in 2011 with more than 256 TB of flash memory.  

SDSC is also home to the Center for Applied Internet Data Analysis (CAIDA), and the Computational and Applied Statistics Laboratory (CASL).  CAIDA is a collaboration of government, research, and commercial entities working together to improve the Internet. It features an academic network test infrastructure called the Archipelago Measurement Infrastructure (Ark), similar to networks such as PlanetLab and RIPE Atlas.

See also
National Digital Library Program (NDLP)
National Digital Information Infrastructure and Preservation Program (NDIIPP)

References

External links
 SDSC
 Michael L. Norman
 PMac
 Allan E. Snavely
 NEESit
 Chronopolis

University of California, San Diego
Supercomputer sites
E-Science
Cyberinfrastructure
La Jolla, San Diego
1985 establishments in California